Caryville is an unincorporated community in the town of Rock Creek, in Dunn County, Wisconsin, United States. The community is on the south shore of the Chippewa River, along State Highway 85, near where Dunn County Highway H crosses the river.

Many people say Caryville is haunted. There have been numerous sightings of ghosts and creatures. This small community is home to many haunted places including a cemetery, a schoolhouse, a church, and a boat landing. All of these places have had reports of ghost sightings. A group of ghost hunters even visited Caryville to see if these stories were true. They ended up finding that some of the locations were indeed haunted while others were not.

History
Founded in the mid-19th century, Caryville had a train station, post office, and Pony Express office by 1895. Menzus R. Bump was designated postmaster of Caryville in 1882. The site of the Hwy H bridge is where a ferry operated from 1910 to 1964 when the bridge was finished. The Caryville ferry was one of six that carried traffic across the Chippewa River in the area designated the Chippewa bottoms, the others being Old Meridean, New Meridean, Fair Play, Tyrone and Rumsey's Landing. The last operator of the Caryville Ferry was F. William (Bill) Alf who ran it from 1949 to 1964 with the help of his sons, Frederick, James, Rodney and Arthur. Caryville is popular with fans of paranormal activity, as area legends report that the community's Sand Hill Cemetery, the old Spring Brook School, and Spring Brook Lutheran Church are haunted. 240th Avenue and the Meridean Slough are also reportedly haunted.

Recreation
Caryville is located along the Chippewa River State Trail, a bike trail on an abandoned line of the Milwaukee Road.

References

External links 
Caryville Savanna
Chippewa River State Trail

Unincorporated communities in Dunn County, Wisconsin
Unincorporated communities in Wisconsin